Vantablack is an extremely black chemical substance.

Vantablack may also refer to:
Vantablack (EP), a 2017 dubstep extended play by Dirtyphonics and Sullivan King
"Vantablack", a 2017 song by French synthwave musician Perturbator
"Vantablack", a 2022 episode of Fleishman Is in Trouble (miniseries)
"Vantablack", the hero codename of Shihai Kuroiro, a character from the manga My Hero Academia

See also
Vanta (disambiguation)